Perfect Harmony is a 1991 film produced by Disney that is set during the Civil Rights Movement. The story highlights the racial tensions of African Americans and whites within a South Carolina town and its private school. The production was filmed at Berry College, and is noted for its soundtrack which featured classical choir pieces. It was released on VHS and later on DVD.

Plot
In 1959, a new teacher named Derek Sanders becomes the new choirmaster for Blanton Academy, a prestigious but all-white private school in South Carolina. Mr. Sanders tries to reduce some of the prejudice and hostility of some of the students in his choir. Paul, a bully who feels he should be lead boy, is the worst offender. Taylor Bradshaw, on the other hand, is impressed by the music of Landy Allen, an African-American boy and grandson of Zeke, the school caretaker. Taylor begins to explore the music and lives of the African-American people who live in Rivertown, despite knowing that it could get him expelled or rejected. Sanders is also impressed by Landy's abilities and attempts to get him involved with the choir. A tragedy in the community brings the race issue to a head.

Cast
Justin Whalin - Taylor Bradshaw
Eugene Byrd - Landy Allen
Darren McGavin - Mr. Hobbs
Peter Scolari -  Mr. Derek Sanders, the Choirmaster
Catherine Mary Stewart - Miss Hobbs, Mr. Hobbs' daughter.
Moses Gunn - Zeke, the campus caretaker
David Faustino - Paul
Casey Ellison - Orville
Richie Havens - Scrapper Johnson
Cleavon Little - Pastor Clarence Johnson
Jeff Cohen - Ward
Devin Ratray - Shelby
Wallace K. Wilkinson - Mayor Macy
Dan Biggers - Doctor

Soundtrack
The film's soundtrack includes "All We Like Sheep" and Hallelujah chorus from Handel's Messiah, Franz Schubert's Ständchen in D Major and Schwanengesang, and Mozart's Laudate Dominum, as well as Vollendet ist das große Werk from Haydn's Creation.

In addition to the classical music featured in the film, it also features prominent spirituals such as I Shall Not Be Moved and Jesus, I Love Calling Your Name

External links
 
Review of the film
 

1991 films
1991 drama films
Films scored by Billy Goldenberg
Films set in South Carolina
Films set in 1959
Civil rights movement in film
Disney Channel original films
American drama television films
1990s English-language films
1990s American films